Thorpe Underwood may refer to the following places:

 Thorpe Underwood, Northamptonshire
 Thorpe Underwood, North Yorkshire